Salem Stadium is a stadium in Salem, Virginia, United States. It is primarily used for football and hosts the home football games of the Salem High School Spartans. It was built in 1985 and seats 7,157 people. The stadium is part of the James E. Taliaferro Sports and Entertainment Complex (named after a former mayor of Salem), which also includes the Salem Civic Center and the Salem Memorial Baseball Stadium.

Salem Stadium hosted the NCAA Division III national football championship game, known as the Amos Alonzo Stagg Bowl from 1993 to 2017. From 2012 to 2015, the National Club Football Association, which sanctions most club football in U.S. colleges, also held its championship games at Salem Stadium; for 2016, Salem was designated as a semifinal site for the NCFA playoffs, but play was moved to the smaller Salem High School. In 2015, the natural playing surface was replaced by FieldTurf in part to ensure that the Stagg Bowl continues to be played in Salem. The field was named the Willis White Field in honor of the former head football coach at Salem High School. Salem Stadium also currently hosts the Virginia High School League football state championships in Group A and the Southwestern Virginia Educational Classic, an annual contest between two football teams from historically black colleges and universities.

References

College football venues
American football venues in Virginia
Sports venues in Salem, Virginia
1985 establishments in Virginia